Phù Tiên is former district of Hải Hưng province in Vietnam. It was formed on March 11, 1977, from merger of Tiên Lữ and Phù Cừ districts.

References 

Former districts of Vietnam